Etna Township may refer to the following townships in the United States:

 Etna Township, Kosciusko County, Indiana
 Etna Township, Licking County, Ohio

See also 
 Etna-Troy Township, Whitley County, Indiana